Judy Krawczyk (born January 24, 1939) is an American Republican politician from Wisconsin.

Born in Green Bay, Wisconsin, Krawczyk was a businesswoman. She served in the Wisconsin State Assembly from 2001 to 2007, when she was defeated in 2006.

Notes

Politicians from Green Bay, Wisconsin
Businesspeople from Wisconsin
Members of the Wisconsin State Assembly
Women state legislators in Wisconsin
1939 births
Living people
21st-century American politicians
21st-century American women politicians